Trevor Allan (born 17 August 1955) is a retired professional tennis player from Australia.  He reached his career-high singles ranking of World No. 57 in July 1984.

Life
Trevor Allan was born in Australia but as his tennis career progressed he moved to France and after retirement he became a tennis coach in Complexe Sportif René Magnac in Marseille. He was Arnaud Clément's coach  in Marseilles.

References

External links

1955 births
Living people
Australian male tennis players
Australian tennis coaches
Tennis people from New South Wales